Sakao Island may refer to one of the two following islands in the archipelago of Vanuatu:
 Sakao Island (Sanma, Vanuatu), off the country's largest island Espiritu Santo, in Sanma province
 Sakao Island (Malampa, Vanuatu), off the country's second largest island Malakula, in Malampa province

See also
List of islands of Vanuatu

Islands of Vanuatu